The 1966 Scotch Cup was the seventh edition of the Scotch Cup with the tournament heading back to Canada for the second time. It was held in Vancouver, Canada at the PNE Forum between March 21–24, 1966.

France debuted in this edition as the tournament expanded to seven teams. In the final it was Canada who reclaimed their title for the seventh time after defeating Scotland 12-5.

Teams

Standings

Results

Draw 1

Draw 2

Draw 3

Draw 4

Draw 5

Draw 6

Draw 7

Playoffs

Semifinals

Final

References

External links
1966 Scotch Cup - Curlingzone

 Video: Scotch Cup curling in Vancouver in 1966 | CBC News - CBC.ca

World Men's Curling Championship
Scot
Curling in British Columbia
March 1966 sports events in Canada
Sports competitions in Vancouver
1960s in Vancouver
1966 in British Columbia
International curling competitions hosted by Canada